Pride Northwest, Inc. is a community-based regional LGBTQ+ Pride 501(c)(3) nonprofit organization based in Portland, Oregon, United States. The non-profit organization was founded in 1994 and the current executive director of the organization is Debra Porta, who has served as the president of Pride Northwest since 2006. 

The organization is best known for organizing the annual Portland Pride Waterfront Festival and Parade. It is dedicated to celebrating and bringing visibility to the LGBTQ+ community in the Pacific Northwest.

Portland LGBT Pride Festival & Parade 
Portland's Waterfront Pride Festival and Parade is produced every June by Pride Northwest. Portland's Pride Weekend is normally scheduled the third weekend following Memorial Day, or the weekend after the conclusion of the Portland Rose Festival. It is a two-day-long event held along the Tom McCall Waterfront Park. The parade typically begins near West Burnside and Park Ave. and extends down Southwest Pine St. and Naito Parkway, finally ending near the Tom McCall Waterfront Park where the main festival is held. In 2019, the parade attendance was estimated to be 45,000 people and approximately 8,000 people from over 200 groups and organizations participated in the parade. The festival is one of the largest donation-based pride events on the West Coast, with a suggested fee of $8 to enter the festival; however, the fee is not mandatory and everyone is allowed to enter. The festival features official events that are listed on Pride Northwest's official website, typically including performances by LGBT talent, a “Gaylabration” at Portland's Crystal Ballroom, the “Big Gay Boat Ride” on the Portland Spirit, and screenings of LGBT films. Many companies, businesses, churches, non-profits, agencies, sports teams, and LGBT organizations gather at the festival to celebrate and show support for the community. Pride Northwest executive director Debra Porta stated that they typically expect over 60,000 plus visitors to attend the festival. Porta encourages attendance for all families and people of any age, stating: “Portland Pride is considered to be one of the most family-friendly on the West Coast.”

History 
Pride Northwest was established in 1994, but Portland's first official pride event took place in 1975 when a group of approximately 200 people organized a Gay Pride Fair near the South Park Blocks by Portland State University.  The following year the Portland Town Council sponsored a fair that was held at the Waterfront Park, and one year later in 1977 the annual parade was added in addition to the fair after Mayor Neil Goldschmidt formally announced a “Gay Pride Day.” The parade and festival have since been celebrated annually and are organized by Pride Northwest. In June 1989 the leather pride flag was used by the leather contingent in the parade, which was its first appearance at a pride parade. According to its website, the organization's mission is "to encourage and celebrate the positive diversity of the lesbian, gay, bisexual, and trans communities, and to assist in the education of all people through the development of activities that showcase the history, accomplishments, and talents of these communities."

Police involvement and controversy 

Portland police officers expressed outrage after LGBT organizers requested that officers who attend the festival and parade not show up in uniform. Executive director of Pride Northwest Debra Porta made a statement explaining the historic divide between marginalized communities and the police, stating that many members of the community do not feel comfortable attending the festival alongside law enforcement in uniform, stating in a letter to Portland police: “To that end, we are asking LGBTQ and allied people in law enforcement, who plan to match in the Portland Pride Parade NOT to march in uniform.” Porta continued to state that though Pride Northwest does not have a preference if officers march in uniform, it is their duty as an organization to ask that officers give thought to the concerns of the community. 

The request was met with backlash, notably from Portland LGBTQ officers who expressed anger and sadness that they must hide a part of their identity from their own community and that asking officers to not be visible erases the struggles many LGBTQ officers have faced coming out and being visible in a patriarchal institution like the police force.

Porta responded to these concerns, stating that “Pride Northwest is a little caught in the middle” regarding this issue. Porta stated that they recognize the work that LGBTQ officers have done for the community and welcome officers to the parade no matter what, however also stating that the historic implications of the police uniform and how marginalized communities who have negative histories with law enforcement are affected should also be considered.

Traffic impact 
The festival is known for having a large impact on Portland traffic that affects drivers downtown. The parade occupies Northwest Park Avenue and West Burnside Street and extends north on Southwest Broadway, east on Northwest Davis Street, and south on Naito Parkway. Drivers are encouraged to avoid parking near or along the parade route as cars parked within a two-block radius are removed. Traffic is also impacted by the festival that takes place at the Tom McCall Waterfront Park. The official parade route can be found on the Pride Northwest official website. Pride Northwest encourages festival and parade attendees and participants to use public transit, rideshare, and taxi services to reduce traffic impact.

References

External links 

 

LGBT culture in Portland, Oregon
LGBT organizations in the United States
1994 establishments in Oregon